Paradoxa  may refer to:
 Paradoxa (fungus), a genus of fungi in the family Tuberaceae
 Paradoxa, a junior synonym of the sea snail genus Pradoxa
 Animalia Paradoxa, a list of animals which are mythical, magical or otherwise suspected not to exist, in editions 1 to 5 of Carl Linnaeus's seminal work Systema Naturae

See also
 Paradoxia, a genus of green algae